Lunar eclipses are grouped by their saros number, each series lasts between 1200 and 1600 years and contains from 69 to 89 lunar eclipses. Lunar eclipses in even series exist at the ascending node of the Moon's orbit, and odd series occur at the descending nodes.

Series have been indexed as −20 to 183 (active between 2000 BCE and 3000 CE), with events summarized:

Each series begins with penumbral eclipses, transitions into partial eclipses and then total eclipses, and then reverses back to partial and penumbral. The counts for each type are listed below in sequence. The notes show two exceptions: 
 Saros 4 started with 2 penumbral, 7 missed eclipses (penumbra missed Moon entirely), and 11 more penumbral before continuing with partial eclipses.
 Saros 13 started with 11 penumbral, 7 partial, 3 more penumbral (umbra missed Moon), and 11 more partial before continuing with total eclipses.

See also 
 List of lunar eclipses

References 

Moon-related lists